Lorica is a genus of chitons in the family Schizochitonidae.

Species

L. haurakiensis
This rare species  is present in New Zealand.

L. volvox
Synonym: Chiton rudis Hutton, 1872 
It is present in Australia (New South Wales).

Extinct representatives 
Extinct representatives of the genus are known from the Cretaceous of America and the Eocene & Miocene of Oceania.<

References

 Powell A. W. B., New Zealand Mollusca, William Collins Publishers Ltd, Auckland, New Zealand 1979 

Loricidae
Extant Cretaceous first appearances